The 1998 Norwegian Figure Skating Championships was held at the Bergenshallen in Bergen from February 6 to 8, 1998. Skaters competed in the discipline of single skating. The results were used to choose the teams to the 1998 World Championships, the 1998 European Championships, the 1998 Nordic Championships, and the 1998 World Junior Championships.

Senior results

Ladies

Junior results

Ladies

References

Norwegian Figure Skating Championships
Norwegian Figure Skating Championships, 1998
1998 in Norwegian sport